North Korea qualified and participated in the 1966 and 2010 FIFA World Cup.

In 1966, North Korea won the first round after competing against the Soviet Union, Chile, and Italy. North Korea progressed to the second round, thus making them the first Asian country to have qualified past the first round. However, they lost to Portugal in the quarter-finals. Seven players were consistently fielded during these matches.

North Korea was the lowest-ranking team to qualify for the 2010 World Cup and did not pass the group stage after losing in all three group matches.

North Korea had four top goalscorers in 1966, and only one goalscorer in the 2010 World Cup.

In 1930, 1934, and 1938 North Korea entered qualification for the FIFA World Cup as part of Japan because Korea was occupied by Japan at that time. However, in the additional years, North Korea either withdrew (1970 and 1978), or did not enter or qualify for the World Cup. Additionally, the country has been banned from participating in the 2026 World Cup.

Summary

1966 in England

After South Africa being disqualified and South Korea having withdrawn due to logistical reasons, North Korea had to compete in a play-off match against Australia in order to qualify, which they won 9–2 on aggregate.

In the third and decisive group match, North Korea beat title contenders Italy 1–0, eliminating them from the competition and advancing to the second stage. No team from Asia had ever progressed from the first round before, and the feat would not be repeated until 1994, when Saudi Arabia reached the Round of 16.

In the quarter-final against Portugal, North Korea managed to lead 3–0 after 22 minutes, but the game was turned around with a final score of 3–5, with Portuguese star player Eusébio scoring four goals.

2010 in South Africa

With a final pre-tournament FIFA ranking of 105th in the world, North Korea was the lowest-ranked team to qualify for the World Cup since the rankings began in 1993.

2010 was North Korea's first appearance at the World Cup since 1966. The draw placed North Korea in Group G. They played their first match against five-time winners Brazil on 15 June. Despite their best efforts, they were outmatched and lost 1–2. In their next game against Portugal on 21 June, they were defeated 0–7. Despite starting well (as against Brazil), their defensive and well-organized approach unraveled after Portugal scored on them. The Koreans lost their final match against Ivory Coast 0–3 on 25 June. Having lost all three group matches, they were knocked out, finishing at the bottom of Group G. It was reported that the small contingency of apparent North Korean football fans were actually Chinese people who bought tickets reserved for North Korean government officials. North Korea subsequently denied the report and claimed that the Chinese were small in number and that the regime had permitted their travel.

Record at the FIFA World Cup

*Draws include knockout matches decided via penalty shoot-out

By match

Record by Opponent

England 1966

Group 4

Quarter-finals

South Africa 2010

Group G

Record players
Seven players have been fielded on all four matches in 1966, making them record World Cup players for their country:

Top goalscorers

References 

 
Korea, North